All for You is the debut studio album by New Zealand boy band Titanium, released by Illegal Musik worldwide on 7 December 2012. After The Edge competition winners were announced and Titanium were formed they began recording the album in Auckland, working with a variety of writers and producers. 
The album is predominantly a pop music album, which orientates into pop rock, dance-pop, teen pop and power pop. The album's lyrical content explores themes about having fun, being young, relationships, empowerment and love issues.

The album received generally favourable reviews from contemporary music critics, commending the album's youthful lyrics and pop sensibility. All For You went to No. 8 on the New Zealand Albums Chart.

The album was released in Australia under the title All For You 2.0 on 4 October 2013.

Track listing

 Without You (3:37)
 Wish You Well (3:26)
 Come On Home (3:31)
 Lies (3:39)
 All for You (3:42)
 For the First Time (3:24)
 Sky (3:44)
 Where I Belong (3:25)
 Nothing but Love (3:46)
 The Price We Pay (3:32)
 I Won't Give Up (3:41)

2.0 Track listing
 Come On Home (3:31)
 I Won't Give Up (3:41) 
 Sky (3:44)
 Unarmed (3:16)
 Lies (3:39)
 Addicted (3:23) 
 For the First Time (3:24)
 Tattoo (3:23)  
 Should've Known Better (3:33)  
 Soundtrack To Summer (4:45)   
 Without You (3:37)
 Wish You Well (3:26)
 All For You (3:42)
 Where I Belong (3:25)
 Nothing but Love (3:46)
 The Price We Pay (3:32) 
 Soundtrack To Summer (Epique Remix) (4:34)

Release history

References

Titanium (band) albums
2012 debut albums